Will Healy (born February 15, 1990) is an American composer, pianist, and artistic director of ShoutHouse, an orchestral hip-hop collective.

Biography

Early life and education 
Healy attended New York City's Loyola School. He completed his Bachelor's of Music degree from Vassar College and received the W.K. Rose Fellowship in Creative Arts and the Jean Slater Edson Prize for his chamber work "Hashima". He obtained a Master's of Music in composition at The Juilliard School where he studied with John Corigliano, Steven Stucky, and Samuel Adler and was recipient of the Richard Rodgers Scholarship

Musical career 
Healy's work has been performed at The Apollo Theater, the New York Philharmonic's Biennial series, the Aspen Music Festival, on "New Sounds" with John Schaefer (WNYC) and "Making Music" (WBAI), The Kennedy Center, Lincoln Center, Carnegie Hall, New York City Ballet, (le) Poisson Rouge, and Midsummer's Music. In 2021, he worked with Kanye West on his album Donda as an arranger, transcriber, and director on live performances. His commissions include Copland House, the Great Lakes Chamber Festival, Novus New Music, Kyo Shin-An Arts, Robert Fleitz and Carrie Frey, Nancy Allen, and others. In 2018, Healy's work, "Kolmanskop," was presented by EarShot (the National Orchestral Composition Discovery Network) and the Jacksonville Symphony. He was also composer in residence at Midsummer's Music in 2021.

In 2014, Healy founded ShoutHouse, a collaborative artistic project and band made up of four composers, five rappers, three jazz soloists, and more than a dozen classical musicians. Their first full length album, "Cityscapes," was released by New Amsterdam Records in 2019.

Awards and honors 
As a composer and arranger, Healy is the recipient of awards including a 2017 Charles Ives Fellowship from the American Academy of Arts and Letters, an ASCAP Foundation Morton Gould Young Composer Award, the W.K. Rose Fellowship, a JFund commission from the American Composers Forum, Musiqa's inaugural Emerging Composer Commission Program, prizes in the Juilliard and Kaleidoscope Orchestra Composition Competitions.

Selected works

Large Ensemble 

 Future Caprices (2017) for string orchestra
 Kolmanskop (2016) for large orchestra

Chamber 

 Machine Learning (2020) for clarinet, violin, cello, and piano
 Threats/Threads (2020) for saxophone quartet
 Highwire (2019) for octet
 Sonata for Saxophone and Piano (2018) for alto saxophone and piano
 Speaking (2015) for soprano saxophone and piano
 Upper West Stomp (2015) for saxophone octet (SSAATTBB) 
 Synapses for Wind Quintet (2013) for wind quintet

Instrumental Solo 

 Omens (2017) for solo piano
 The Wisher (2017) for solo harp
 Prelude for Rrita (2016) for solo piano
 Etudes for Melancholy Robots (2014-2017) for solo piano
 Nocturnes for Jamie (2013) for solo piano
 Orbit (2012) for solo harp

Choral 

 Scrawl (2019) for SSAATTBB a cappella
 Tell Me (2019) for SSAATTBB and piano

Cityscapes (2019) 

 Mannahatta (2016)
 Hudson Drones (2017)
 Grand Central (2015)
 ANTS (2015)
 Rebuild (2016)

ShoutHouse, Music of Will Healy (2015) 

 The Song I Wanted to Hear (2014)
 Fully Mechanized (2014)
 Light (2014)
 On Lucid Dreams (2014)
 Meet Halfway

References

External links 

 Official Website

1990 births
Living people

Juilliard School alumni
21st-century American composers
Musicians from New York City
Composers from New York City